Poslíček lásky  is a 1937 Czechoslovak romance film, directed by Miroslav Cikán. It stars Rolf Wanka, Hana Vítová, Jindřich Plachta.

Cast
Rolf Wanka as Pavel Toman
Hana Vítová as Jirina
Jindřich Plachta as Její otec
Václav Trégl as Úcetní Fábera
Bedřich Veverka as Brok
Bohuš Záhorský as Curry
Vlasta Hrubá as Jeho Spolecnice
Fanda Mrázek as Holic
Milada Smolíková as Uklízecka
Slávka Doležalová as Slecna Ema

See also
Not a Word About Love (1937)

References

External links
Poslíček lásky at the Internet Movie Database

1937 films
Czechoslovak romance films
1930s romance films
Films directed by Miroslav Cikán
Czech romantic films
1930s Czech-language films
Czechoslovak multilingual films
Czechoslovak black-and-white films
1937 multilingual films
1930s Czech films